Central Asiatic Journal is a biannual academic journal covering research on the languages, history, archaeology, religious and textual traditions of Central Asia.

Abstracting and indexing
The journal is abstracted and indexed in the Arts and Humanities Citation Index and Current Contents/Arts & Humanities.

References

External links

Central Asian studies journals
Biannual journals
Multilingual journals
Publications established in 1955
1955 establishments in Germany
Harrassowitz Verlag academic journals